Anxiang County is a county in Hunan Province, China, it is under the administration of the prefecture-level city of Changde. The county is located at one of the inflows of Dongting Lake, on the north in Hunan Province and the southeast in Changde City, and it borders in the north to Gong'an County, in the west to Li County, Jinshi City and Dingcheng District, the south by Nan County, the east by Shishou City. It is divided into eight towns and four townships under its jurisdiction. The county seat is Shenliu.

Anxiang was established as Zuotang County in 40 AD, gaining its current name during the Northern and Southern dynasties period.

Administrative divisions
According to the result on adjustment of township-level administrative divisions of Hanshou County on November 19, 2015 Hanshou County has eight towns and four townships under its jurisdiction. They are:

8 Towns
 Shenliu, county seat
 Huangshantou
 Xiayukou
 Guandang, Shayang
 Sanchahe
 Dajinggang
 Dahukou
 Chenjiazui

4 Townships
 Anzhang
 Anquan
 Ankang, Anxiang
 Anfeng, Anxiang

Climate

Famous residents 

 Fan Zhongyan (989 – 1052), writer
 Yin Keng (阴铿, 511－563), writer

References

External links

 
County-level divisions of Hunan
Changde